Nathan Lane is an American actor, comedian and writer known for his performances in film, television and theatre.

He is most known for his theatre roles on and off Broadway including his Tony Award winning performances as Pseudolus in the 1996 revival of A Funny Thing Happened on the Way to the Forum (1996), as Max Bialystock in the original production of The Producers (2001), and as Roy Cohn in the revival of Tony Kushner's Angels in America. Lane's Broadway theatre performances also include Present Laughter (1982), Merlin (1984), Wind in the Willows (1985), Guys and Dolls (1992), Laughter on the 23rd Floor (1994), Love! Valour! Compassion! (1995), The Man Who Came to Dinner (2000), The Frogs (2004), The Odd Couple (2005), Butley (2006), Waiting For Godot (2009), The Addams Family (2010), The Nance (2013), It's Only a Play and The Iceman Cometh (2014), The Front Page (2016), and Gary: A Sequel to Titus Andronicus (2019).

Lane is known for his leading performances in the comedy films The Birdcage, (1996), Mouse Hunt (1997), and The Producers (2005). He has also voiced Timon in the Disney animated film The Lion King (1994) and its sequels and Snowbell the cat in Stuart Little (1999). He is also known for his supporting performances in films such as Ironweed (1987), Frankie and Johnny (1991), Jeffrey (1995), Nicholas Nickleby (2002), Swing Vote (2008), Mirror Mirror (2012), The English Teacher (2013) and Carrie Pilby (2016).

Lane also is well known for his guest starring appearances in various television shows including Miami Vice, The Days and Nights of Molly Dodd, Frasier, Mad About You, Curb Your Enthusiasm, 30 Rock, Absolutely Fabulous, Modern Family, The Good Wife, and The Blacklist. Lane also appeared as F. Lee Bailey in Ryan Murphy's limited series American Crime Story: The People v. O.J. Simpson (2016) and as Detective Lewis Michener in the Showtime series Penny Dreadful: City of Angels (2020). He has recurring roles on Only Murders in the Building for Hulu starring Steve Martin, Martin Short, and Selena Gomez, for which he received his first Primetime Emmy and the new HBO series The Gilded Age written by Julian Fellowes.

Filmography

Film

Source: IMDb and Turner Classic Movies

Television

Source: Internet Movie Database and Turner Classic Movies

Theatre

Video games

Other
 Presented Mike Birbiglia's (2008) Off-Broadway show Sleepwalk With Me.
 Lane provided the voice of Tom Morrow, the Audio-Animatronic host of Disneyland's Innoventions attraction.
 Children's book Naughty Mabel, written with husband Devlin Elliott, published by Simon and Schuster, released in October 2015. A second book, Naughty Mabel Sees It All was released in October 2016.
 Wrote the introduction to Neil Simon's Memoirs, published by Simon and Schuster.

External links

References 

Living people
American male film actors
American male musical theatre actors
American male stage actors
American male television actors
American male voice actors
American male Shakespearean actors
Year of birth missing (living people)